Brendan Lombard (born 22 March 1980) is an Irish former hurler. At club level he played with Ballinhassig and divisional side Carrigdhoun and was also a member of the Cork senior hurling team. Lombard usually lined out in defence.

Career

Lombard first played hurling at juvenile and underage levels with the Ballinhassig club before eventually progressing onto the club's top adult team. During a hugely successful career he won numerous South East titles, three County Championship titles across two grades, Munster club Championships and an All-Ireland Junior Club Championship title in 2003. He also earned selection to the Carrigdhoun divisional team. Lombard first appeared on the inter-county scene as a member of the Cork minor hurling team that beat Kilkenny in the 1998 All-Ireland minor final. He later lined out with the under-21 team before winning three All-Ireland Championships with the intermediate team, including one as team captain. Lombard was a member of the senior panel in 2003 before making his debut during the 2004 National League.

Career statistics

Honours

Ballinhassig
Munster Intermediate Club Hurling Championship: 2005
Cork Premier Intermediate Hurling Championship: 2005, 2012
All-Ireland Junior Club Hurling Championship: 2003
Munster Junior Club Hurling Championship: 2002
Cork Junior A Hurling Championship: 2002
South East Junior A Hurling Championship: 1998, 2000, 2002

Cork
Munster Senior Hurling Championship: 2003
All-Ireland Intermediate Hurling Championship: 2001, 2003, 2006
Munster Intermediate Hurling Championship: 2001, 2003, 2006
All-Ireland Minor Hurling Championship: 1998
Munster Minor Hurling Championship: 1998

References

1980 births
Living people
Ballinhassig hurlers
Carrigdhoun hurlers
Cork inter-county hurlers